Church of the Assumption or Church of the Assumption of Mary may refer to:

Bosnia and Herzegovina 
Church of the Assumption of the Blessed Virgin Mary, Uskoplje
Church of the Assumption, Jajce

Bulgaria 
Church of the Assumption (Uzundzhovo)

Czech Republic 
Church of the Assumption of the Virgin Mary (Most)
Church of the Assumption of Our Lady and Saint John the Baptist, Kutná Hora

Germany 
Church of the Assumption of the Blessed Virgin Mary, Frauenau

Haiti
Cathedral of Our Lady of the Assumption, Port-au-Prince

Ireland
Church of the Assumption, Booterstown, Dublin
Church of the Assumption, Howth, Dublin

Italy 
Church of the Assumption of Mary, Riola di Vergato
Santa Maria Assunta, Galzignano Terme

Latvia
Assumption of Our Lady Church, Bolderāja

Lithuania 
Vytautas' the Great Church of the Assumption of The Holy Virgin Mary

Malaysia
Church of the Assumption (Penang)

Malta
Parish Church of St. Mary, Attard, also known as Parish Church of the Assumption
St Mary's Chapel, Bir Miftuħ, also known as Medieval Chapel of the Assumption of Mary
Parish Church of St. Mary, Birkirkara, also known as Parish Church of the Assumption of Mary
St Mary's Church, Għaxaq, also known as Parish Church of the Assumption of Mary
St Mary's Church, Gudja, also known as Archpresbyterial and Archmatrix Church of the Assumption of Mary
Parish Church of the Assumption of the Blessed Virgin Mary into Heaven, Mġarr
Rotunda of Mosta, also known as Sanctuary Basilica of the Assumption of Our Lady
St Mary's Church, Mqabba, also known as Parish Church of the Assumption of Mary 
Parish Church of the Assumption, Qrendi
Cathedral of the Assumption, Gozo
Parish Church of the Assumption of Mary, Żebbuġ, Gozo
St Mary's Church, Żurrieq, also known as Church of the Assumption of Mary
Tal-Virtù Church, also known as Church of the Assumption of Mary of tal-Virtù

Morocco 
Church of the Assumption (El Jadida)

Poland 
Church of the Assumption, Kłodzko

Russia 
Church of the Assumption (Aksay)
Church of the Assumption of Mary (Astrakhan)
Church of the Assumption, Nedvigovka

Serbia 
Church of the Assumption, Zrenjanin

Slovakia 
Church of the Assumption of the Virgin Mary, Košice
Assumption of Mary Church (Rožňava)

Slovenia 
Church of the Assumption of the Virgin Mary and Roch (Jesenice)

Spain
Church of la Asunción (Albacete)
Church of la Asunción (Almansa)
Church of la Asunción (Hellín)
Church of la Asunción (Letur)

United States 
Holy Assumption of the Virgin Mary Church, Kenai, Alaska
Church of the Assumption (Pocatello, Idaho)
Church of the Assumption and Rectory, Topeka, Kansas
St. Mary's Assumption Church (New Orleans, Louisiana)
Saint Mary of the Assumption Church, Rectory, School and Convent, Brookline, Massachusetts
Assumption of the Blessed Virgin Mary Church, Detroit, Michigan
Church of the Assumption (Phoenix, Michigan)
Church of the Assumption (Saint Paul, Minnesota)
Church of the Assumption (New York City), New York
Church of the Assumption (Nashville, Tennessee)
St. Mary of the Assumption Church (Fort Worth), Texas
St. Mary's Church of the Assumption (Praha, Texas)

See also
Our Lady of the Assumption Church (disambiguation)
Cathedral of the Assumption (disambiguation)
Cathedral of Our Lady of the Assumption (disambiguation)
Church of the Dormition (disambiguation)